Eastwood's longtailed seps (Tetradactylus eastwoodae), also known commonly as Eastwood's whip lizard was a species of lizard in the family Cordylidae. The species was endemic to South Africa. Its natural habitat was subtropical or tropical high-altitude grassland. It became extinct due to habitat loss.

Etymology
The specific name, eastwoodae, is in honor of Miss A. Eastwood who collected the holotype.

Description
T. eastwoodae was snake-like, with very small legs. Each front leg had only three toes, and each back leg had only two toes.

Reproduction
T. eastwoodae was oviparous.

Extinction
The type locality for T. eastwoodae is the Haenertsburg area near Woodbush in the Letaba district approximately  West of where the Magoebaskloof hotel now is, where two specimens were found during the early 20th century around 1911. Subsequently, the area has been intensively planted to Eucalyptus and Pinus tree species for commercial use, and the grasslands where this species once occurred have now been eradicated. Searches in remaining grasslands have not been able to establish that any living specimens remain, and since no specimens since 1911 have been found, it is now considered extinct.

References

Further reading
Berger-Dell'Mour HAE (1983). "Der Übergang von Echse zu Schleiche in der Gattung Tetradactylus, Merrem ". Zoologische Jahrbücher. Abteilung für Anatomie und Ontogenie der Tiere 110: 1–152. (in German).
Branch, Bill (2004). Field Guide to Snakes and other Reptiles of Southern Africa. Third Revised edition, Second impression. Sanibel Island, Florida: Ralph Curtis Books. 399 pp. . (Tetradactylus eastwoodae, p. 183).
FitzSimons VF (1943). The Lizards of South Africa. Transvaal Museum Memoir No. 1. Pretoria: Transvaal Museum. xvi + 528 pp. (Tetradactylus eastwoodae, p. 294).
Hewitt J, Methuen PA (1913). "Descriptions of some New Batrachia and Lacertilia from South Africa". Transactions of the Royal Society of South Africa 3 (1): 107–111. (Tetradactylus eastwoodae, new species).

Tetradactylus
Extinct reptiles
Extinct animals of Africa
Reptiles described in 1913
Taxa named by Paul Ayshford Methuen
Taxa named by John Hewitt (herpetologist)
Taxonomy articles created by Polbot